Yuno Yamanaka (born 25 December 2000) is a Japanese middle-distance runner. She qualified to represent Japan at the 2020 Summer Olympics in Tokyo 2021, competing in women's 3000 metres steeplechase.

Personal life
Yamanaka was born in Sakai on 25 December 2000. In addition to being an athlete, she also works as a bank employee.

References

 

2000 births
Living people
Japanese female middle-distance runners
Japanese female steeplechase runners
Athletes (track and field) at the 2020 Summer Olympics
Olympic athletes of Japan
21st-century Japanese women